The 1993 PSA Men's World Open Squash Championship is the men's edition of the 1993 World Open, which serves as the individual world championship for squash players. The event took place in Karachi in Pakistan from 18 November to 23 November 1993. Jansher Khan won his fifth World Open title, defeating Jahangir Khan in the final.

Seeds

Draw and results

See also
PSA World Open
1993 Women's World Open Squash Championship

References

External links
World Squash History

World Squash Championships
M
1993 in Pakistani sport
Sport in Karachi
Squash tournaments in Pakistan
International sports competitions hosted by Pakistan